Kara-Oy may refer to the following places in Kyrgyzstan:

 Kara-Oy, Issyk-Kul, in the Issyk-Kul District, Issyk-Kul Region
 Kara-Oy, Osh, in the Nookat District, Osh Region
 Kara-Oy, Talas, in the Talas District, Talas Region